Styppeiochloa is a genus of African plants in the grass family.

 Species
 Styppeiochloa catherineana Cope & Ryves - Angola
 Styppeiochloa gynoglossa (Gooss.) De Winter - Mozambique, Zimbabwe, Eswatini, Cape Province, KwaZulu-Natal, Limpopo, Mpumalanga, Gauteng
 Styppeiochloa hitchcockii (A.Camus) Cope - Madagascar

References

Molinieae
Bunchgrasses of Africa
Poaceae genera